Key Lime Air is a United States airline with corporate headquarters at Denver International Airport in Denver, Colorado, within the Denver metropolitan area.
Established in 1997, Key Lime Air operates scheduled air service, various types of public and private charter (under its Denver Air Connection brand), and United Parcel Service cargo feeder operations.

Denver Air Connection 

Key Lime Air operates FAR Part 121 scheduled regional flights through its Denver Air Connection brand from Denver International Airport. Additionally, Key Lime operates public air charter services under FAR Part 135 from Denver's Centennial Airport.

Cargo operations 
Key Lime Air operates on-demand cargo flights using Fairchild Swearingen Metroliner aircraft. Cargo operations carry UPS overnight and express delivery packages throughout Colorado, Wyoming, Nebraska, and Kansas.

Fleet 
The Key Lime Air fleet includes:

Incidents and accidents 

 December 30, 2014 – A Key Lime Air Cessna 404, aircraft registration N404MG, operating as Flight LYM182, had an engine fail shortly after takeoff from Centennial Airport, Englewood, Colorado, and the pilot was unable to successfully return to the airport. The airplane was destroyed and the pilot and sole occupant were killed. The reason for the engine failure could not be conclusively determined, but the pilot did not properly secure the failed engine, making it more difficult to continue flying.
 January 21, 2015 – Key Lime Air Piper PA-31 N66906, on a cargo flight to Colby, Kansas, crashed while attempting an emergency landing at Goodland Municipal Airport after one engine failed and the other engine lost power. The aircraft struck power lines before crashing in a field; the pilot and sole aircraft occupant were not injured but the aircraft sustained serious damage. The crash was attributed to fuel starvation caused by the pilot's poor fuel management; a contributing factor was pilot fatigue.
 December 5, 2016 – Key Lime Air Fairchild Swearingen SA-227DC Metro N765FA, operating as Flight LYM308, crashed in Camilla, Georgia after both wings failed. The flight was en route to Southwest Georgia Regional Airport and there were heavy rains and storms in the area at the time. The sole aircraft occupant, the pilot, was killed. The accident was attributed to the pilot's decision to continue flight into an area of known severe weather, his loss of control due to spatial disorientation, and the aircraft's ensuing in-flight breakup.
 May 12, 2021 – A Cirrus SR22 N416DJ and Key Lime Air Flight 970, Swearingen SA-226-TC Metro N280KL operating a charter cargo flight, collided on approach to Centennial Airport in Colorado. The Cirrus made a safe off-airport parachute-assisted landing, while the Key Lime pilot landed safely at Centennial despite the loss of a section of the cabin roof, and damage to the empennage. There were no injuries.

References

External links 
 
 Charter Alliance Group LLC. dba Denver Air Connection (DCA)

Regional airlines of the United States
Airlines established in 1997
Cargo airlines of the United States
1997 establishments in Colorado
Airlines based in Colorado
Aviation in the United States